Mushtaq Omar Uddin (born 14 August 1973), also known simply as Mushtaq, is an English music producer, singer, songwriter, and former lead vocalist for British hip hop group Fun-Da-Mental when he was known at the time by his stage name MC Mushtaq.

Early life
Uddin was born in London to Bangladeshi and Iranian parents. He attended Quintin Kynaston Community Academy and studied Sociology at Maria Fedeilis. He later received a scholarship at Guildhall School of Music and Drama to study contemporary composition.

As a young boy, Uddin joined a community band as a drummer where he met brothers Sam (State of Bengal) and Deeder Zaman. In 1987, Uddin became an original member the State of Bengal group which included Sam and Deeder Zaman.

Singing career
In summer 1993, Uddin met Aki "Propa-Gandhi" Nawaz and joined Fun-Da-Mental as the lead vocalist under the stage name of MC Mushtaq.

On 24 July 2000, Uddin's debut solo single "That Feelin'" was released by Mercury Records. This was followed by his debut album released later that year. The album features blues, reggae, funk and classic rock.

Music production career
During the 1990s, Uddin started his career as a "beat maker" in New York for a number hip hop bands, including Cypress Hill, House of Pain and Souls of Mischief.

Uddin co-wrote and produced the album The Hour of Two Lights with Terry Hall, released in August 2003.

Uddin has co-wrote and produced several R&B albums. In 2001, he worked on Damage's album Since You've Been Gone, he co-wrote and produced the tracks "I Don't Know" (featuring Emma Bunton), "Good Folk", and "Maria" (featuring Kele Le Roc), and co-wrote "So What If I" (featuring Iceberg Slimm). He co-wrote and produced Mis-Teeq's album Lickin' on Both Sides, including the track "B with Me". He worked on Liberty X's album Thinking It Over, he co-wrote and co-produced the track "No Clouds", and co-wrote the track "Saturday".

He co-wrote and produced several tracks on Raghav's 2004 album Storyteller and 2012 album The Phoenix. He produced several tracks from Tyler James' 2005 album The Unlikely Lad, including the single "Foolish", and the track "Best for Me" (featuring Amy Winehouse).

He co-wrote and produced the song "Take Your Time" from Simon Webbe's 2006 album Grace.

He co-wrote and produced Amy Winehouse's 2003 album Frank and 2006 album Back to Black, including a remix of the song "Back to Black".

He produced Skepta's 2012 song "Hold On", the track "Des Mots" (featuring LFDV) from Kery James's 2013 album Dernier MC, and Charlie Brown's 2012 song "Dependency" and 2013 song  "On My Way". He co-wrote and co-produced Tich's 2013 song "Dumb".

Personal life
Uddin is a Muslim.

Discography

Albums

Singles

See also
Asian Underground
British Bangladeshis
List of British Bangladeshis

References

External links

Mushtaq Omar Uddin on Artistdirect

1973 births
Living people
English Muslims
English people of Bangladeshi descent
English people of Iranian descent
English hip hop musicians
English male singer-songwriters
English record producers
English drummers
British male drummers
English keyboardists
Singers from London
Writers from London
People from Cricklewood
People educated at Quintin Kynaston School
Alumni of the Guildhall School of Music and Drama
Mercury Records artists
21st-century English singers
21st-century drummers
21st-century British male singers